Skyang Kangri, or Staircase Peak, is a high mountain peak of the Baltoro Muztagh, a subrange of the Karakoram range. The name "Staircase Peak" refers to the East Ridge, which resembles a giant staircase with five steps.

Geology
As can be determined from limited exposures, the summit, northern, and northeast slopes of Skyang Kangri consist predominately of limestones of the Shaksgam formation that are largely covered by ice. Further south and west, exposures of K2 Gneiss occur between it and Skyang Luungpa Glacier where the K2 Gneiss is in fault contact with highly folded and faulted strata of the Shaksgam and Baltoro formations. The lower southeast flank of Skyang Kangri consists of a strip of black slate of the Baltoro formation that underlies the Shaksgam Formation and is in fault contact with main body of K2 Gneiss that comprises K2.

The Shaksgam Formation consists of massive, brown-grey, shallow-marine, shelf limestones. These limestones contain occasional interbeds of brown and yellowish sandstone and light-colored marl. They are weakly metamorphosed and highly fossiliferous. They contain an abundance of Permian fossils that include brachiopods (Productus sp.) lamellibranchs, bryozoans, corals, crinoids and foraminifera (Parafusulina sp.).

The Baltoro Formation consists of thin-bedded black, foliated shales often grading into black slates. The slates are highly cleaved and metamorphosed as high as lower greenschist facies. Interlayered with the slates are thin beds of dark coloured limestone and sandstone. These strata are unfossiliferous and presumed on the basis of their stratigraphic position to date to the Carboniferous Period. The slates of the Baltoro Formation is part of a thick sequence of well-cleaved black shales and slates that are exposed along almost the entire length of the Karakoram. These black shales and slates include the Singhie shales, Sarpo Laggo slate, and Pasu slates.

Climbing history
Skyang Kangri was first attempted by the party of renowned climber and explorer Luigi Amadeo di Savoia, the Duke of the Abruzzi, in 1909, during an expedition to K2. They attempted the East Ridge, as did a subsequent failed attempt in 1975, in which one climber died and one had to be evacuated by helicopter. The first ascent was made in 1976 by a Japanese expedition, climbing the East Ridge without major incident.

In 1980, well-known American climbers Jeff Lowe and Michael Kennedy attempted the West Face of Skyang Kangri, but reached only about 7,070 metres. According to the 
Himalayan Index, there have been no subsequent attempts on the mountain.

Passes 
Windy Gap is a -high mountain pass  at east of K2, north of Broad Peak, and south of Skyang Kangri.

See also
 List of mountains in Pakistan

Sources
 Jill Neate, High Asia: an illustrated history of the 7,000 metre peaks, The Mountaineers, 1989.
 Jerzy Wala, Orographical Sketch Map of the Karakoram, Swiss Foundation for Alpine Research, 1990.

References

External links
 Northern Pakistan detailed placemarks in Google Earth
 Virtual Aerial Video of Skyang Kangri

Mountains of Xinjiang
China–Pakistan border
International mountains of Asia
Seven-thousanders of the Karakoram
Mountains of Gilgit-Baltistan